The following is a List of awards and nominations received by American actor, comedian, writer, director and producer Bob Odenkirk.

Major associations

Golden Globe Awards

Primetime Emmy Awards

Screen Actors Guild Awards

Other awards and nominations

Avignon Film Festival

Boston Society of Film Critics

Critics' Choice Movie Awards

Critics' Choice Super Awards

Critics' Choice Television Awards

DVD Exclusive Awards

Golden Raspberry Awards

Independent Film Festival Boston

Phoenix Film Festival

Saturn Awards

Satellite Awards

Sidewalk Moving Picture Festival

Slamdance Film Festival

TCA Awards

References

External links
 

Odenkirk, Bob